CHEO is a pediatric health-care and research centre located in Ottawa, Ontario, Canada. CHEO is also a tertiary trauma centre for children in Eastern Ontario, Nunavut, Northern Ontario and the Outaouais region of Quebec and one of only seven Level I trauma centres for children in Canada (others being The Hospital for Sick Children in Toronto, the Montreal Children's Hospital in Montreal, the Centre hospitalier universitaire Sainte-Justine in Montreal, IWK Health Centre in Halifax, Alberta Children's Hospital in Calgary, Stollery Children's Hospital in Edmonton, and BC Children's Hospital in Vancouver). It is affiliated with The Ottawa Hospital and the University of Ottawa, and is funded by the provincial Government of Ontario. CHEO first opened its doors on May 17, 1974, and is located at 401 Smyth Road, Ottawa, Ontario.

CHEO includes a hospital, children's treatment centre, school and research institute, with satellite services located throughout Eastern Ontario. CHEO provides complex pediatric care, research and education. CHEO is a founding member of Kids Health Alliance, a network of partners.

In addition to its clinical mandate, CHEO is an academic health science centre. Each year, it provides education to 2,300 future pediatricians, nurses, and other health professionals.

Funding 
CHEO is funded by the provincial government of Ontario as well as by a variety of public donations. One of the hospital's major sources of funding is the CHEO Foundation, which was incorporated in 1974.

Hospital characteristics (2019-2020) 
Services:
 6,623 admissions to CHEO
 73,645 emergency department visits
 7,783 visits to Surgical Day Care
 179,394 ambulatory visits
 11,319 visits to Medical Day Unit (i.e. oncology, dialysis, hematology, etc.)
Facility (2019–2020):
 167 inpatient beds
 20 Neonatal Intensive Care Unit (NICU)
 10 Intensive Care Unit (ICU)
 112 Pediatrics, Oncology, Adolescent Medicine and Surgery
 25 Psychiatry
 73 outpatient specialty clinics
Research Institute
 73,800 sq feet of research space
 676 staff and trainees
 299 scientists and clinical investigators
 780 active research grants
 634 active studies recruiting patients
 546 publications
 73,283 patients & families involved in research
Personnel:
 1,856 administrative, service and allied health staff
 679 nursing staff
 318 physicians
 700 volunteers

Timeline 

CHEO was formed in 1974 due to the efforts of the community requesting a bilingual healthcare centre for children and the approval by the provincial government. The timeline indicates the year major areas of the hospital were established.

1974 - Children's Hospital of Eastern Ontario is opened to patients.
1975 -  Pediatric Neurosurgery Program      
 1977 - Dental Clinic
1980 - Burn Treatment Centre
1981 - Sports Injury Clinic, Pulmonary Function Lab, Poison Information Centre
1983 - CTV Telethon is formed
1984 - Research Institute
1985 - Community volunteers build a Child Activity Centre
1988 - The first two bone marrow transplants in Canada using unrelated HLA compatible donors are performed at CHEO.
1989 - Neonatal Transport Team
1991 - Cardiovascular Surgery Program
1992 - Heliport is built
1996 - Youthnet/Réseau Ado, a mental health promotion program for youth
2001 - First phase of redevelopment project begins, the Telehealth program is formed
 2003 - Max Keeping Wing opens
2004 - Apoptosis Research Centre
2005 - New state-of-the-art cauterization laboratory
2006 - Lets Keep Kids Out Of The Hospital campaign, surgery virtual tour is created, Child Life Interactive Computers for Kids (CLICK) is introduced, Ontario's Newborn Screening Program begins, and Roger's House, a hospice for palliative pediatric care is opened
2007 - First Vertical Expandable Prosthetic Titanium Rib (VEPTR) in Ontario, eating disorders program is introduced
2008 - Parental Presence at Induction (PPI) is introduced, allowing parents to be with their children before and after surgery
2009 - Garry Cardiff Wing  is opened, houses the emergency department, the neonatal and pediatric intensive care units and the medical day unit for children and youth afflicted with serious illnesses requiring outpatient treatments.
2009 - CHEO opens their off-site Centre for Healthy Active Living, with clinics focused on Obesity and Type II Diabetes
2019 - The Children's Hospital rebranded with the name CHEO which no longer served as an abbreviation

See also
 List of children's hospitals

References 

Hospital buildings completed in 1974
Hospitals in Ottawa
Eastern Ontario
Teaching hospitals in Canada
Research in Ottawa
Hospitals established in 1974
Heliports in Ontario
Certified airports in Ontario